The 1900 Harvard Crimson football team represented Harvard University in the 1900 college football season. In its second season under head coach Benjamin Dibblee, Harvard compiled a 10–1 record, shut out seven of 11 opponents, and outscored all opponents by a total of 205 to 44. The 1900 team won its first 10 games, but closed the season with a 28–0 loss against rival Yale.

Walter Camp selected three Harvard players as first-team selections to his 1900 College Football All-America Team. They were ends John Hallowell and Dave Campbell and quarterback Charles Dudley Daly.

Schedule

References

Harvard
Harvard Crimson football seasons
Harvard Crimson football
1900s in Boston